Great Grape is a compilation album released by Columbia Records in 1972 that compiles songs from three of Moby Grape's Columbia albums - Moby Grape, Wow, and Moby Grape '69. It has been speculated that Columbia's decision to release this album was based solely on trying to capitalize on any interest generated in Moby Grape by the then-recent release of a new studio album, 20 Granite Creek, on Reprise Records. For some unknown reason the album was never issued on a cassette tape, although it was issued on an 8-Track tape.

Track listing

Side one
 "Omaha" (Skip Spence) – 2:22
 "Murder in My Heart for the Judge" (Jerry Miller, Don Stevenson) – 2:57
 "Bitter Wind" (Bob Mosley) – 3:04
 "It's a Beautiful Day Today" (Bob Mosley) – 3:06
 "Changes" (Jerry Miller, Don Stevenson) – 3:21

Side two
 "Motorcycle Irene" (Skip Spence) – 2:23
 "Trucking Man" (Bob Mosley) – 2:00
 "Someday" (Jerry Miller, Don Stevenson) – 2:39
 "8:05" (Jerry Miller, Don Stevenson) – 2:19
 "Ooh Mama Ooh" (Jerry Miller, Don Stevenson) – 2:25
 "Naked, If I Want To" (Jerry Miller) – 0:55

Personnel
 Peter Lewis – rhythm guitar, vocals
 Jerry Miller – lead guitar, vocals
 Bob Mosley - bass, vocals
 Skip Spence - rhythm guitar, vocals
 Don Stevenson – drums, vocals

References

Moby Grape albums
1972 compilation albums
Albums produced by Dave Rubinson
Columbia Records compilation albums